Joan Winifred Airey-Weedon (4 April 1926 – 16 October 1994) was a British artistic gymnast. She competed in the 1948 Summer Olympics.

References

1926 births
1994 deaths
Gymnasts at the 1948 Summer Olympics
British female artistic gymnasts
Olympic gymnasts of Great Britain
People from Croydon
20th-century British women